Wrociszów Górny  is a village in the administrative district of Gmina Sulików, within Zgorzelec County, Lower Silesian Voivodeship, in south-western Poland, close to the Czech border.

Gallery

References

Villages in Zgorzelec County